Dusmadiores is a genus of spiders in the family Zodariidae. It was first described in 1987 by Jocqué. , it contains 6 species.

Species
Dusmadiores comprises the following species:
Dusmadiores deserticola Jocqué, 2011
Dusmadiores doubeni Jocqué, 1987
Dusmadiores katelijnae Jocqué, 1987
Dusmadiores laminatus Russell-Smith & Jocqué, 2015
Dusmadiores orientalis Jocqué & van Harten, 2015
Dusmadiores robanja Jocqué, 1987

References

Zodariidae
Araneomorphae genera
Spiders of Asia
Spiders of Africa